The Deportivo fronton is a Basque pelota fronton, used mainly in the modalities of hand-pelota, short bat, long bat, pala and paleta. It is located in Bilbao and owned by the local municipality. The 52-metre-long facility closed to the public in 2011 (it is still used by the sports club based there, with reduced playing dimensions), with events in the city moving to the Bizkaia fronton in the Miribilla district.

The fronton was home to the 1944 and 1957 1st Hand-Pelota singles championship, and the 1958, 1959, 1960 and 1994 2nd Hand-Pelota singles championship.

Championships

1st Hand-Pelota singles championship

2nd Hand-Pelota singles championship

References

Fronton (court)
Basque pelota
Sport in Bilbao
Sports venues in the Basque Country (autonomous community)
Sports venues completed in 1931
1931 establishments in Spain
2011 disestablishments in Spain